The Men's Teams 8 table tennis competition at the 2004 Summer Paralympics was held 23–27 September 2004 at the Galatsi Olympic Hall.

Classes 6–10 were for athletes with a physical impairment who competed from a standing position; the lower the number, the greater the impact the impairment had on an athlete’s ability to compete.

The event was won by the team representing .

Results

Preliminaries

Group A

Group B

Competition bracket

Team Lists

References

M